Azzedine Aït Djoudi (born January 24, 1967) is an Algerian football manager.

Managerial career
From a young age (10 years), he began a football career at JS Kabylie in which he moved up the levels to reach the status of the ISTS professionnel. Diplômé opted for an early coaching career at the age 24 years at Sidi Aich SS, ESM Boudouaou, JS Bordj Menaiel, USM El Harrach, JSM Bejaia, MSP Batna which has been fairly successful, since he won the trust of several major Algerian club USM Alger, JS Kabylie, CR Belouizdad, ES Setif. He was then recruited by CS Sfaxien, to a friendly separation with the club in late September 2009. In early October 2009, he was appointed as coach of the Hope sports Zarzis. In January 2010, he returned to the country to train Khroub> He has worked in national team in 2001 as an assistant to Abdelhamid Kermali in a duo with Abdelhamid Zouba.

ES Sétif
Aït Djoudi, In September 2008, was contacted by President Serrar to make the team in hand with that has won over 35 games and finished champions Algeria and semifinalist cutting Arabic
Écouter
Lire phonétiquement

CS Sfaxien
June 2009 was contacted by the club president with Moncef Sellami who met in Paris to conclude until late September was an amicable separation was made.

Algeria Under 23s
On September 13, 2010, Aït Djoudi was appointed as manager of the Algeria national under-23 football team. He signed a two-year contract with the Algerian Football Federation, with his main objective being to qualify the team for the 2012 Summer Olympics in London. Under his guidance, he led the team to the 2010 UNAF U-23 Tournament title in Morocco with 3 wins in 3 games. He then qualified the team to the 2011 CAF U-23 Championship, beating Madagascar and Zambia in the qualifiers.

Honours

Algerian Ligue Professionnelle 1 (3)
Winner: 2003 USM Alger
Winner: 2004 JS Kabylie
Winner: 2009 ES Setif

Algerian Cup (3)
Winner: 2003 USM Alger
Finalist: 2004 JS Kabylie
Finalist: 2014 JS Kabylie

References

1967 births
Living people
People from Tébessa
Algerian footballers
JS Kabylie players
Association football midfielders
Algerian football managers
Olympique de Médéa managers
USM El Harrach managers
USM Annaba managers
USM Alger managers
JS Kabylie managers

CA Bordj Bou Arréridj managers
CR Belouizdad managers
Hassania Agadir managers
ES Sétif managers
CS Sfaxien managers
ES Zarzis managers
AS Khroub managers
Algeria under-23 international managers
Maghreb de Fès managers
NA Hussein Dey managers
MC El Eulma managers
Olympique Club de Khouribga managers
MO Béjaïa managers
AS Aïn M'lila managers
US Biskra managers
Expatriate football managers in Tunisia
Algerian expatriate sportspeople in Tunisia
Expatriate football managers in Morocco
Algerian expatriate sportspeople in Morocco
21st-century Algerian people